Age of Cannibals is a 2014 German drama film directed by Johannes Naber, starring Devid Striesow, Katharina Schüttler and Sebastian Blomberg. It tells the story of two business consultants who travel to impoverished and corrupt countries where they make shady business deals, never having to leave their hotels. The film is made like a chamber play with stylised and grotesque acting. Principal photography took place from 8 January to 14 February 2013.

The premiere took place at the 64th Berlin International Film Festival, where the film played in the section Perspektive Deutsches Kino. At the German Film Award 2015 it received the third-place prize in the category Best Fiction Film and the prize for Best Screenplay. It was also nominated for Best Direction.

Cast
 Devid Striesow as Frank Öllers
 Sebastian Blomberg as Kai Niederländer
 Katharina Schüttler as Bianca März
 Romesh Ranganathan as Singh
 Steve Ellery as John Schernikau
 Jaymes Butler as Vincent Akume
 Warsame Guled as Mulatu
 Florence Kasumba as Magdalena
 Joana Adu-Gyamfi as Saralina
 Veronica Naujocks as Asa Onochi

References

External links
 Official website 
 

2014 drama films
2014 films
German drama films
2010s German-language films
Ethically disputed business practices
2010s German films